Bobby Clell Burnett (January 4, 1943 – October 1, 2016) was a college and professional American football player.

Originally a halfback from the University of Arkansas, Burnett in 1966, his first year with the  Buffalo Bills of the American Football League (AFL), had a combined total of 1,185 yards rushing and receiving, with over 12 yards per catch and 4 touchdowns on 34 receptions.  He had 766 yards on 187 rushes, with 4 rushing touchdowns. He was that year's AFL Rookie of the Year, and was also selected to the 1966 AFL All-Star team. He died of pancreatic cancer on October 1, 2016.

See also
List of American Football League players

References

1943 births
2016 deaths
American football running backs
Arkansas Razorbacks football players
Buffalo Bills players
Denver Broncos (AFL) players
American Football League All-Star players
American Football League Rookies of the Year
People from Clinton, Arkansas
Players of American football from Arkansas
American Football League players